Ch'asu is a superior military rank of North Korea, often translated as Vice Marshal.  The rank is senior to that of Daejang (General) and junior to that of Wonsu (Marshal).  The rank is seldom bestowed upon the professional military, and appears to be rather a combined political-military position.

The insignia for a chasu is superimposing a North Korean national crest upon a marshal's insignia star in the shoulder epaulette. Formerly, insignia for such rank holders was the emblem of North Korea until the present insignia was released in 1985.

The rank is often transliterated as ch'asu, showing the difference with the Korean word for embroidery, usually transliterated as chasu (:wikt:자수).

List of North Korean vice-marshals

References

Military ranks of North Korea